Wilf Crawford (24 August 1915 – 6 June 1993) was a Scotland international rugby union player. He played as a Flanker. He later was a noted horse-racing trainer.

Rugby Union career

Amateur career

Crawford played for the Portsmouth club United Services.

He also played for the Royal Navy.

Provincial career

He played for the Scotland Possibles side against the Scotland Probables side in the final trial match of the 1937-38 season to determine international selection. He impressed the selectors in the first half and then turned out for the Probables in the second half.

International career

Crawford was capped by Scotland 5 times. The caps came in 1938, when Scotland won the Triple Crown, and 1939.

Horse-racing career

After his rugby union career finished Crawford became a noted horse-racing trainer. He began training horses from his farm in Haddington mainly for personal friends.

He was interviewed by the Daily Mirror in 1966 on the effect of the Betting Tax on the horse-racing industry:
"I really think the situation is gloomy. It may mean smaller fields, leading to smaller prizes, fewer spectators, a breeding recession, fewer owners, and the closing of more courses."

Military career

Crawford was a Sub-Lieutenant in the Royal Navy.

References

1915 births
1993 deaths
Royal Navy rugby union players
Rugby union players from Rochester, Kent
Scotland international rugby union players
Scotland Possibles players
Scotland Probables players
Scottish rugby union players
United Services players
Rugby union flankers